Fillis is a surname. Notable people with the surname include:

James Fillis (1834–1913), English-born French riding master
John Fillis (1724–1792), Canadian merchant and politician

See also
Gillis (surname)
Tillis
Willis (surname)